Cosgrave is an Irish surname. Notable people with the surname include:

 Fran Cosgrave (born 1977), Irish nightclub owner
 James Cosgrave (1865–1936), Irish politician
 James Cosgrave (cricketer) (born 1932), Australian cricketer
 John B. Cosgrave (born 1946),  Irish mathematician
 Lawrence Moore Cosgrave (1890–1971),  Canadian soldier and diplomat
 Liam Cosgrave (1920–2017), Irish politician, fifth Taoiseach
 Liam T. Cosgrave (born 1956), Irish politician
 Michael Joe Cosgrave (1938–2022), Irish politician
 Niamh Cosgrave (born 1964), Irish politician
 Philip Cosgrave (1884–1923), Irish politician
 W. T. Cosgrave (1880–1965), Irish politician, President of the Executive Council of the Irish Free State from 1922 to 1932

See also
 Cosgrove (disambiguation)